The 1916–17 Kansas Jayhawks men's basketball team represented the University of Kansas during the 1916–17 college men's basketball season.

Roster
Leon Gibbens
Walter Kauder
Howard Laslett
Adrian Lindsey
Harold Lytle
Lawrence Nelson
Rudolf Uhrlaub
Ernst Uhrlaub
Ivan Wilson
George Woodward

Schedule and results

References

Kansas
Kansas Jayhawks men's basketball seasons
Kansas Jayhawks Men's Basketball Team
Kansas Jayhawks Men's Basketball Team